Jason Christopher Prior (born 20 December 1988) is an English footballer who plays as a striker for National League side Dorking Wanderers. He has previously played for non-league sides AFC Newbury, Moneyfields and Margate. He made his full Football League debut for AFC Wimbledon on 28 January 2012.

Club career

Non-League career
Starting as a central Midfielder, Prior began his career at Premier Division Wessex League club AFC Newbury. The club narrowly avoided relegation in the 2005–06 season and found themselves in financial difficulties in the close season when they lost the lease on their Town Ground stadium in Berkshire, and as a result, were demoted to Division One of the Wessex League. Prior subsequently left the club and signed for fellow Wessex League side Moneyfields. Here he was converted to the position of striker when it became apparent that he had a natural talent for scoring goals. In September 2009, Prior moved to Isthmian League Premier Division side Bognor Regis Town. It was here that he found the most prolific form of his career to date, scoring 95 goals in 126 appearances for the club. The striker was due to be sold to Conference South side Eastleigh for a fee of £12,000 in January 2012. However, before the deal could take place Prior was offered the opportunity of a trial at Premier League side Newcastle United. On 10 January 2012 Prior scored for Newcastle United Reserves' in a 3–1 win over Wigan Athletic Reserves in the 2011-12 Premier Reserve League. In spite of a successful three-week trial period however, the striker failed to win a contract with "The Magpies" and was subsequently released on 23 January 2012.

AFC Wimbledon
On 26 January 2012, Prior signed for League Two club AFC Wimbledon on a two-and-a-half-year contract. Prior made his football league debut for AFC Wimbledon on 28 January 2012 as a second-half substitute for George Moncur in a 2–1 defeat at home to Aldershot Town. The debut proved to be an ill-fated one for Prior, however, as he injured a tendon in his knee that side-lined him for nearly two months. Having recovered Prior made his first league start for AFC Wimbledon on 9 April 2012 in a 2–0 defeat away to Southend United. The next game against Crawley Town on 14 April 2012 heaped further injury woes on Prior however, as in the first six minutes he was on the receiving end of a wild lunge by Hope Akpan which resulted in Prior being stretchered off with a broken leg. AFC Wimbledon physiotherapist, Mike Rayner, confirmed later that day that an X-ray had shown that Prior had broken both his tibia and his fibula which would prevent him playing again for over nine months. After a long recuperation, Prior was finally able to make his return to league football on 29 December 2012, in a 3–0 defeat at home to Oxford United. On 18 March 2013, it was announced that Prior had joined Conference side Dartford on a one-month loan to help improve his match fitness. On 14 May 2013, Prior was released from his contract and left AFC Wimbledon.

Dartford
On 18 March 2013, it was announced that Prior had joined Conference side Dartford on a one-month loan. Prior scored his first goal for Dartford in a 2–0 win over Telford United on 6 April 2013. Prior made nine appearances, scoring one goal, during the loan spell before returning to AFC Wimbledon. Following his release from "The Dons" on 14 May, Prior re-joined Dartford on a permanent deal on 15 July 2013.

Margate
For the 2014/15 season, Prior teamed up with his former AFC Wimbledon boss Terry Brown by signing a two-year deal with Margate. However, he found opportunities limited at Hartsdown Park, making just 14 appearances, and spent the majority of the season on loan at former club Bognor Regis Town.

Bognor Regis Town
During the summer of 2015, he was released from his contract at Margate and returned to Bognor on a permanent basis for the 2015/16 season. Prior scored 40 goals in 52 games all competitions, in a season in which the Rocks reached the FA Trophy semi-final.

Career statistics

References

External links

1988 births
Living people
Footballers from Portsmouth
English footballers
Association football forwards
A.F.C. Newbury players
Moneyfields F.C. players
Bognor Regis Town F.C. players
AFC Wimbledon players
Dartford F.C. players
Gosport Borough F.C. players
Margate F.C. players
Havant & Waterlooville F.C. players
Dorking Wanderers F.C. players
English Football League players
Isthmian League players
National League (English football) players